Thomas Forbes (30 November 1900 – 31 January 1988) was an English poet and painter. He is considered part of the Post-Aesthetic Movement.

Birth and early life 

Born in Paris, he was the eldest of three to Robert Forbes and Amelie Racine. His parents had previously lived in Paris selling paintings and working as plongeurs (kitchen and dishwasher assistants) before returning to raise their son in London.

He spent his early years at 15 Grosvenor Gardens, where his father befriended the poet Algernon Charles Swinburne who occasionally looked after Thomas as a toddler, reading him poetry and ballads before he slept. The Family later moved to 7 Bellevue Road, North London where he grew up.
He attended Northside Primary School in Barnet, where his first poems have been recorded to have been written from the age of five.

It is believed that Swinburne's ballads had induced Thomas to write.
It was his father, however, who influenced him to paint. It is understood that Thomas would enter his father's studio at their home without permission and alter his paintings. His father would hear him and enter the room and send him back to bed. 
They spent a lot of time together in the studio and occasionally collaborated on several paintings. 
It wasn't until the age of seventeen that Thomas Forbes became serious about painting and writing Poetry. He met the poet Stevie Smith through his younger brother and the two became quite close, writing together in until Thomas went to the University of Liverpool to study English literature. 
At university he met and fell in love with fellow student and poet Emily Roe-Darley. The poem "My English Rose" (1921) is about her.

In his second year he left the course and returned to London with Emily after becoming anxious and homesick. The two married and lived together in Highgate, London to concentrate on writing and painting. His bouts of anxiety and depression during his time at university  are highlighted in the early writings of Dear Poetic Conscience.

Works 

Forbes's early poetry is extremely difficult to get hold of.

Thomas Forbes is mostly known for his written works Dear Poetic Conscience (1922) and Dream Stream (1941). His poetry has been described by critics as being "pleasantly blunt and cutting." His work is also notable for its arrogant use of his own made-up slang. He sold only a dozen paintings in his lifetime. Most of his other artwork accompanied his poetry.

During the Second World War, he wrote a lot of war poetry from his perception of the front line rather than of the soldiers. The poem which gained most success from the War over our head (1944) series is entitled "This is our Trench".

Dear Poetic Conscience (1922) 

In Dear Poetic Conscience, written at university, Forbes explores the relationship between himself and as poet. Aspiring to be a poet from an early age, these works ask questions of what it takes to be a poet and he makes reference to Arthur Rimbaud, Paul Verlaine, and his wife Emily Roe-Darley.

It is considered by many as being in diary form rather than poetry. Though much of the book is written in free verse, its rhythmic structure maintains its poetic characteristics.
It opens with "Look at what you've got yourself here, a new book for a new year."

Roe-Darley also had her own entries submitted in the final edition.

Later life and death 

After the war, his house in Highgate was left badly damaged by German bomb raids and the majority of money he earned from publishing his work was spent on repairs. He fell into a depression and attempted a failed double suicide with his wife.

Cash-strapped, Thomas Forbes moved alone back to his birthplace, Paris.
It is said that he completed only a few paintings and had virtually given up on writing poetry. The only piece of work recorded by Thomas Forbes in Paris was written weeks before his death and was entitled "Is it fair, Lumiere?" (1988). Thomas Forbes died of alcohol-related problems in Paris on 31 January 1988. He is buried in the Père Lachaise Cemetery in Paris.

1900 births
1988 deaths
20th-century English poets
British expatriates in France